Carrikerella ceratophora is a species of mantis in the genus Carrikerella in the order Mantodea.

See also
List of mantis genera and species

References

ceratophora
Insects described in 1922